Abraham Heights is a suburb of Lancaster, Lancashire, England.

Geography
It is west of the city centre, with the River Lune to the north and west, and the village of Aldcliffe to the south.

Geography of Lancaster, Lancashire